Aneurin Bevan University Health Board (ABUHB) is the local health board of NHS Wales for Gwent, in the south-east of Wales. Headquartered in Caerleon, the local health board (LHB) was launched in October 2009 through the merger of Gwent Healthcare NHS Trust and Blaenau Gwent, Caerphilly, Newport, Torfaen, and Monmouthshire LHBs. It is named after Aneurin Bevan, a Member of Parliament who represented the area and who was the Minister of Health responsible for the foundation of the National Health Service. Aneurin Bevan University Health Board is the operational name of Aneurin Bevan Local Health Board.

The Board's total catchment area for health care services contains a population of about 600,000. Acute, intermediate, primary and community care and mental health services are all provided across a network of primary-care practices, community clinics, health centres, one learning disability hospital, a number of community hospitals, mental health facilities, one local general hospital and three district general hospitals – Royal Gwent, Nevill Hall and Ysbyty Ystrad Fawr. In 2010 Ysbyty Aneurin Bevan hospital replaced several small community hospitals in Blaenau Gwent.

In April 2012 the Board was fined £70,000 for breaching patient confidentiality. It was the first NHS organisation to be fined under the Data Protection Act.

The Grange University Hospital is due to open in Llanfrechfa in 2021 but 384 beds was opened in April 2020, a year in advance of schedule, in case they were needed for the COVID-19 pandemic in Wales, enabled by the extensive adoption of offsite fabrication. The hospital opened in full on 17 November 2020.

The plan is to centralise some acute services currently located at the Royal Gwent and Nevill Hall Hospitals.

Hospitals
Current
Chepstow Community Hospital, Chepstow
County Hospital, Torfaen
Grange University Hospital, Cwmbran
Llanfrechfa Grange Hospital, Cwmbran
Maindiff Court Hospital, Abergavenny
Monnow Vale Integrated Health and Social Care Facility, Monmouth
Nevill Hall Hospital, Abergavenny
Royal Gwent Hospital, Newport
St Cadoc's Hospital, Caerleon, Newport
St Woolos Hospital, Newport
Ysbyty Aneurin Bevan, Blaenau Gwent
Ysbyty'r Tri Chwm, Ebbw Vale
Ysbyty Ystrad Fawr, Ystrad Mynach

Former
Aberbargoed Hospital, Aberbargoed (closed 2010)
Abertillery and District Hospital, Abertillery (closed 2008)
Blaenavon Hospital, Blaenavon (closed 2014)
Blaina & District Hospital, Blaina (closed 2010)
Caerphilly District Miners Hospital, Caerphilly (closed 2011)
Cottage Hospital, Monmouth (closed 2006)
Oakdale Hospital, Oakdale (closed 2011)
Redwood Memorial Hospital, Rhymney (closed 2013)
Tredegar General Hospital, Tredegar (closed 2010)
Ystrad Mynach Hospital, Ystrad Mynach (closed 2011)

References

External links